Rodinsky's Room is a non-fiction book by the British authors Rachel Lichtenstein and Iain Sinclair,  first published by Granta Books in 1999. Sections are written alternately by each author. It tells the story of Lichtenstein's attempts to uncover the story of the reclusive Jewish autodidact  David Rodinsky, who disappeared in the late 1960s and whose room above a synagogue at 19 Princelet Street  in the  Spitalfields area in the East End of London was discovered undisturbed 20 years later.

References

External links
Amazon.co.uk page

1999 non-fiction books
Granta Books books
Collaborative non-fiction books